Fenikhi (also Romanized as Fenīkhī, Faneykhī, and Fanikhi; also known as Fīnkhī-ye Kūchak) is a village in Bostan Rural District, Bostan District, Dasht-e Azadegan County, Khuzestan Province, Iran. According to the 2006 census, its population was 251, in 39 families.

References 

Populated places in Dasht-e Azadegan County